Jim Hilgartner is an American author of poetry and fiction. He received his MFA from the University of Alabama. He taught at Alabama and at Alabama Southern Community College, and since 2006 has been teaching English at Huntingdon College in Montgomery, Alabama. Hilgartner has twice received the Fellowship in Literature from the Alabama State Council on the Arts: in 2001 and again in 2011.

References

Living people
University of Alabama alumni
University of Alabama faculty
Writers from Alabama
Year of birth missing (living people)
Place of birth missing (living people)